Microlophus theresiae, commonly called Theresia's Pacific iguana, is a species of lizard in the family Tropiduridae.

Etymology
The specific name, theresiae, is in honor of Princess Theresa of Bavaria, who collected the type specimens.

Geographic range
M. theresiae is  endemic to Peru.

Habitat

Diet
M. theresiae preys upon aquatic Hemiptera.

Reproduction
M. theresiae is oviparous.

References

Further reading
Schlüter U (2000). "Wüstenkielschwanzleguane aus Peru ". Draco 1 (4): 44–49. (in German).
Steindachner F (1901). "Herpetologische und ichthyologische Ergebnisse einer Reise nach Südamerika mit einer Einleitung von Therese Prinzessin von Baiern ". Anzeiger der Kaiserlichen Akademie der Wissenschaften, Mathematisch-Naturwissenschaftliche Classe 38: 194–196. (Tropidurus theresiae, new species, p. 195). (in German).
Torres-Carvajal O (2004). "The Abdominal Skeleton of Tropidurid Lizards (Squamta: Tropiduridae)". Herpetologica 60 (1): 75–83. (Microlophus theresiae, new combination).

theresiae
Lizards of South America
Endemic fauna of Peru
Reptiles of Peru
Reptiles described in 1901
Taxa named by Franz Steindachner